Deng Chueng-hwai (born 18 November 1940) is a former Taiwanese cyclist. He competed at the 1964 Summer Olympics and the 1968 Summer Olympics.

References

External links
 

1940 births
Living people
Taiwanese male cyclists
Olympic cyclists of Taiwan
Cyclists at the 1964 Summer Olympics
Cyclists at the 1968 Summer Olympics
People from Hsinchu